Marcelo José Ribeiro  (born 16 April 1973), commonly known as  Roque , is a former Brazilian footballer.

Club career
Roque played for Portuguesa and Guarani in the Campeonato Brasileiro Série A. He also spent one season with Panionios in the Greek Super League.

References

1973 births
Living people
Brazilian footballers
Brazilian expatriate footballers
Associação Portuguesa de Desportos players
Guarani FC players
Panionios F.C. players
Expatriate footballers in Greece
Association football midfielders
Footballers from São Paulo